Graves Branch is a stream in Washington County in the U.S. state of Missouri. It is a tributary of Cub Creek.

Graves Branch has the name of the local Graves family.

See also
List of rivers of Missouri

References

Rivers of Washington County, Missouri
Rivers of Missouri